{{DISPLAYTITLE:C15H12N2O3}}
The molecular formula C15H12N2O3 (molar mass: 268.27 g/mol, exact mass: 268.0848 g/mol) may refer to:

 Disperse Red 11
 Hydrofuramide

Molecular formulas